The German Space Operations Center (GSOC) is the mission control center of German Aerospace Center (DLR) in Oberpfaffenhofen near Munich, Germany.

Tasks 
The GSOC performs the following tasks in national and international spaceflight:
Operation of scientific satellites
Operation of commercial satellites
Operation of human spaceflight
Expansion and operation of the communication infrastructure
Research and development of new technologies in the field of space operations

History 
After the Federal Republic of Germany decided in the 1960s to launch a national space program and to participate in international space projects, the idea of having its own space control center became concrete. In 1967, then Federal Minister of Finance Franz Josef Strauss laid the foundation stone for the first building complex, which was also opened a little later.

Until 1985, the Oberpfaffenhofen site of the then German Aerospace Research and Testing Institute (DFVLR) increasingly concentrated on spaceflight. The human spaceflight received special attention. Indeed, the GSOC then accompanied two crewed missions: During STS-61-A in 1985, GSOC took over the control of the Spacelab, while flight control continued from NASA's Lyndon B. Johnson Space Center was acquired. For the first time, the Payload Operation Control Center (POCC) of a US space mission was directed outside of NASA. This also means that, for the first time, a human spaceflight was (partially) monitored from outside the USA or the Soviet Union. During this mission, then Bavarian Prime Minister Franz Josef Strauss announced on 5 November 1985 an extensive investment program with which the role of Oberpfaffenhofen in European spaceflight should be increased.

But the failure of Ariane 3 in 1985 and the Challenger disaster in 1986 slowed the development of the Oberpfaffenhofen and thus the GSOC. Nevertheless, the investment program also gave the GSOC a new building (Building 140), the construction began on 4 April 1989.

In 1993, GSOC accompanied the entire operation with STS-55 and had full payload control via the Spacelab. This was the first time that there was unfiltered access to all data.

Missions operated by GSOC

Crewed missions

Earth Observation and Science

Communication and Navigation

See also 
 German space programme

References

External links 
 The German Space Operations Center

Space programme of Germany